Khankaspis is a poorly preserved arthropod genus that contains one species, K. bazhanovi, recovered from the Snegurovka Formation of Siberia, Russia. Some authors have placed Khankaspis within the order Strabopida, but poorly preserved material precludes detailed comparisons with other Cambrian arthropods.

References 

Cambrian arthropods
Cambrian animals of Asia
Fossils of Russia
Fossil taxa described in 1969
Controversial taxa
Cambrian genus extinctions